Marriage on the Panke (German: Hochzeit an der Panke) is a play by Wolfgang Böttcher. A musical comedy, it premiered at the Theater am Schiffbauerdamm on 23 January 1935. It marked the directoral debut of actor Veit Harlan. The title refer to the Panke, a small river that runs through the working-class district of Wedding in Berlin. It was popular with audiences, although critics were generally dismissive. The cast included Gerhard Bienert, who makes subtle jokes about Hermann Göring.

References

Bibliography
 Noack, Frank. Veit Harlan: The Life and Work of a Nazi Filmmaker. University Press of Kentucky, 2016.

1935 plays
German plays
comedy plays
German musicals